Mount Przywitowski is a mountain, 2,770 m, standing at the southeast side of Holdsworth Glacier, 2.5 nautical miles (4.6 km) west of McNally Peak, in the Queen Maud Mountains. Mapped by United States Geological Survey (USGS) from surveys and U.S. Navy air photos, 1960–64. Named by Advisory Committee on Antarctic Names (US-ACAN) for Richard F. Przywitowski, "Ski", United States Antarctic Research Program (USARP) scientific leader at South Pole Station, winter over 1966, and scientific leader at McMurdo Station winter over 1968.

Queen Maud Mountains
Mountains of the Ross Dependency
Amundsen Coast